Isac Brännström (born 21 April 1998) is a Swedish professional ice hockey forward. He is currently playing with Luleå HF of the Swedish Hockey League (SHL). His younger brother, Erik Brännström, is a defenceman for the Ottawa Senators of the National Hockey League (NHL).

Playing career
Brännström played junior hockey with Swedish team HV71. In 2012–13, he debuted at the under-16 level, in the J16 SM. The following season he dressed for 26 U-18 games recording 29 goals and 28 assists. He also competed with a regional all-star team from Småland in the annual TV-pucken, an under-15 national tournament. After impressive seasons in the J20 SuperElit; Brännström logged his first minutes against Färjestad BK, in Sweden's top-flight SHL.

On 11 April 2019, Brännström left HV71 after three seasons in the SHL to sign as a free agent on a two-year contract with rival club, Luleå HF.

Career statistics

Awards and honors

References

External links

1998 births
Living people
HV71 players
Luleå HF players 
Swedish ice hockey forwards
Ice hockey people from Stockholm
Tingsryds AIF players